The Chadian Association of Baptist Churches (ATEBAM) is a Baptist Christian denomination in Chad. The headquarters is in N'Djamena.

History
The Chadian Association of Baptist Churches has its origins in an American mission of the Baptist Mid-Missions organization in 1925 in Sarh. In the 1930s, a hospital and a Bible college were established in Koumra. In 1964, the association was officially founded. In 1979, she founded the Youth of Baptist Churches of Chad, an organization for young people.

See also 

 Bible
 Born again
 Worship service (evangelicalism)
 Jesus Christ
 Believers' Church

References

Christian organizations established in 1963
Baptist denominations in Africa
Baptist denominations established in the 20th century
Evangelicalism in Chad